Mi-sook is a Korean feminine given name. Its meaning differs based on the hanja used to write each syllable of the name. There are 33 hanja with the reading "mi" and 13 hanja with the reading "sook" on the South Korean government's official list of hanja which may be registered for use in given names. Mi-sook was the second-most popular name for newborn girls in South Korea in 1960.

People with this name include:
Kim Mi-sook (born 1959), South Korean actress
Lee Mi-sook (born 1961), South Korean actress
Chung Misook (born 1962), South Korean voice actress
Kim Mi-sook (handballer) (born 1962), South Korean handball player
Ki Mi-sook (born 1967), South Korean handball player
Kang Mi-suk (curler) (born 1968), South Korean wheelchair curler
Kang Mi-suk (weightlifter) (born 1977), South Korean weightlifter

See also
List of Korean given names

References

Korean feminine given names